Hugo Rodríguez Romero (born 30 December 1989), sometimes known simply as Hugo, is a Spanish footballer who plays for San Fernando CD as a winger.

Club career
Born in Jerez de la Frontera, Andalusia, Rodríguez graduated with Sevilla FC's youth setup. He made his senior debuts with the C-team in the 2008–09 campaign, in Tercera División.

On 22 November 2008 Hugo played his first match as a professional, playing the entire second half and scoring the reserves' only in a 1–2 home loss against Xerez CD in the Segunda División championship. He appeared in 23 matches, with his side being relegated.

On 17 May 2012, after appearing regularly for Sevilla Atlético in Segunda División B, Rodríguez moved to another reserve team, CA Osasuna B also in the third level. He subsequently resumed his career in the same division, representing Real Unión, La Hoya Lorca CF, Cádiz CF, Pontevedra CF (on loan), Mérida AD, FC Cartagena and Cultural y Deportiva Leonesa.

References

External links

1989 births
Living people
Footballers from Jerez de la Frontera
Spanish footballers
Association football wingers
Segunda División players
Segunda División B players
Tercera División players
Sevilla FC C players
Sevilla Atlético players
CA Osasuna B players
Real Unión footballers
Lorca FC players
Cádiz CF players
Pontevedra CF footballers
Mérida AD players
FC Cartagena footballers
Cultural Leonesa footballers
San Fernando CD players